Eucolliuris is a genus of beetles in the family Carabidae, containing the following species:

 Eucolliuris aegyptiaca Jedlicka, 1960 
 Eucolliuris aethiopica (Raffray, 1885) 
 Eucolliuris amoenula (Peringuey, 1896) 
 Eucolliuris angolensis (Peringuey, 1896) 
 Eucolliuris brachydera (Alluaud, 1918) 
 Eucolliuris brunneomarginata (Rousseau, 1900) 
 Eucolliuris capicola (Peringuey, 1896) 
 Eucolliuris celebensis (Gestro, 1875) 
 Eucolliuris cribriceps (Bates, 1889) 
 Eucolliuris cribrifrons (Liebke, 1931) 
 Eucolliuris cyanauges (Andrewes, 1936) 
 Eucolliuris decorsei (Alluaud, 1917) 
 Eucolliuris dissimilis Basilewsky, 1965 
 Eucolliuris dorsalis (Peringuey, 1896) 
 Eucolliuris fukiensis Jedlicka, 1953 
 Eucolliuris fulvipennis (Chaudoir, 1872) 
 Eucolliuris fuscipennis Chaudoir, 1850
 Eucolliuris globulicollis Jeannel, 1948 
 Eucolliuris interrupta (Fairmaire, 1885) 
 Eucolliuris kivuensis Basilewsky, 1965 
 Eucolliuris labathiei Jeannel, 1948 
 Eucolliuris latifascia Chaudoir, 1872 
 Eucolliuris litura Schmidt-Gobel, 1846 
 Eucolliuris madagascariensis (Alluaud, 1899) 
 Eucolliuris natalensis (Chaudoir, 1862) 
 Eucolliuris olivieri (Buquet, 1864) 
 Eucolliuris rossi (Darlington, 1968) 
 Eucolliuris suturalis (Peringuey, 1896) 
 Eucolliuris usherae Basilewsky, 1965 
 Eucolliuris virgulifera (Chaudoir, 1872)

References

Lebiinae